Mill Creek (formerly, Mill Creek Homesite)  is a small town in Tehama County, California most noted for its close location to Lassen Peak. It is located at an elevation of 4737 feet (1444 m).

The community takes its name from nearby Mill Creek.

Mill Creek is part of the larger Mineral, California census-designated place, established in or after 1980.

References

Unincorporated communities in California
Unincorporated communities in Tehama County, California